The USS Altair (AD-11) was the lead ship of a class of three destroyer tenders. 
She was named for Altair, the brightest star in the constellation Aquila.

Service history

United States Shipping Board, 1919–1921
The Altair was laid down as the steel-hulled, single-screw freighter ID-4156  Edisto under a United States Shipping Board (USSB) contract on 18 December 1918 at Seattle, Washington, by the Skinner and Eddy Corporation. Launched on 10 May 1919, the Edisto came under naval scrutiny in the 13th Naval District, being given the identification number (Id. No.) 4156 and initially earmarked for potential service as a collier. After a brief period of operation by the USSB, the Edisto was transferred to the Navy by executive order on 29 October 1921 and renamed the Altair on 2 November 1921. Classified as a destroyer tender, AD-11, the ship was delivered to the Navy on 5 December 1921 and commissioned at the New York Navy Yard the following day, 6 December 1921.

Destroyer tender, 1921–1939
Converted to a destroyer tender at the New York Navy Yard, and equipped with surplus and salvaged machine tools and shop equipment selected from dismantled Navy and Army war plants in the demobilization after World War I, the Altair underwent her metamorphosis in nine months and then fitted out at her conversion yard into late November, 1922. She then proceeded to the west coast of the United States via Newport, Rhode Island; Hampton Roads and the Panama Canal Zone, reaching San Diego, California, on 17 December 1922. She was assigned to Destroyer Squadron 12, Destroyer Squadrons, Battle Fleet — a unit of 19 destroyers (one "leader" and three six-ship divisions) operating at that time with 84% complements as part of the "rotating reserve."

From 1922 to 1939, the Altair followed her charges and provided support services wherever required (jobs work that varied from simple repairs to reblading turbines). During this time, to have her own capabilities maintained, she underwent yearly upkeep at the Mare Island Navy Yard. As an example of her following the fleet to ply her vital trade, in 1925, the Altair supported her assigned destroyers in Hawaiian waters during joint Army-Navy maneuvers designed to test the defenses of that Pacific base, and that summer and autumn, when the United States Fleet carried out its Australian cruise, the Altair visited Tutuila, Samoa; Port Phillip, Australia and Lyttelton, New Zealand, during the course of her voyage. In 1926, the events in Nicaragua prompted the dispatch of a sailors and Marines from ships of the Special Service Squadron, and later from other ships in the fleet. However, "as the danger points moved inland", the Secretary of the Navy's report for 1928 states, "it became advisable to use marines for this duty." Accordingly, a Marine expeditionary force, some 3,000-men strong, was dispatched to Nicaragua early in 1927. The Altair participated in this troop lift, when she and the destroyer tender  transported Marine Observation Squadron 1 and a rifle company from San Diego to Corinto, a port on the west coast of Nicaragua, reaching their destination 16 February 1927. The destroyer tender then resumed her operations providing services to the destroyers of Squadron 12, accompanying them to Narragansett Bay for tactical exercises before ultimately returning once more to San Diego.

World War II

1939–1941
When World War II began in Europe in the autumn of 1939, the Altair was tending Destroyer Squadrons 4 and 6, of Destroyer Flotilla 2, Battle Force, still based on San Diego. In March 1940, however, to service the destroyers of the Hawaiian Detachment sent to Pearl Harbor in December of the previous year, the Altair was shifted to Pearl. En route to her new duty station, she served as plane guard for Navy Consolidated PBY Catalina flying boats being ferried to Oahu, arriving at Pearl Harbor on 16 April 1940. She tended destroyers there through the end of the year 1940 and into 1941 as the fleet based permanently on Pearl Harbor following the conclusion of Fleet Problem XXI.

1941–1943
Overhauled at Mare Island Navy Yard from 6 April to 6 June 1941, the Altair returned to Pearl Harbor on 26 June. For the next three months the destroyer tender discharged her duty there until she departed Hawaiian waters on 30 September for the west coast. Pausing briefly at San Diego from 12–18 October, the ship pushed south, transited the Panama Canal on 2–3 November 1941, and arrived at her new duty station, Hamilton, Bermuda, on 11 November 1941, to provide support for destroyers operating on patrols in the North Atlantic.

After the Japanese attack upon the Pacific Fleet at Pearl Harbor brought the United States into World War II, the Altair maintained a routine of carrying out upkeep and repairs on Atlantic Fleet destroyers at Bermuda that continued into the summer of 1942. Except for brief periods at Aruba and Curaçao, in the Dutch West Indies, in early September, the Altair tended destroyers at Trinidad through mid-July 1943.

1943–1946
Following an availability at the Norfolk Navy Yard, the Altair reported to Commander, Operational Training Command, Atlantic Fleet, on 21 August 1943 and soon resumed active tender operations at Bermuda, this time in support of the destroyer and destroyer escort shakedown group (Task Group 23.1) until shifted to Guantánamo Bay, Cuba, where she arrived on 11 March 1945. Providing tender services at Guantánamo Bay until 3 May 1945, the Altair then returned to the Norfolk Navy Yard to be prepared for service in the Pacific theater. While the ship was on her way, Nazi Germany surrendered unconditionally and the European war ended. Prepared for "distant service", the Altair emerged from the Norfolk Navy Yard on 26 July and set course for the Pacific. Arriving in the Panama Canal Zone on 4 August, the ship remained there for the eleven days while World War II in the Pacific hastened to a conclusion with the explosion of two atomic bombs over Hiroshima and Nagasaki. The Altair sailed for Pearl Harbor on 15 August 1945. The Altair reached Pearl Harbor on 6 September 1945 and provided tender services to small ships and craft into the early spring of 1946. She departed Hawaiian waters for the last time on 27 April 1946 and reached San Francisco, California on 8 May, slated for disposal within the 12th Naval District.

Decommissioning and disposal
Decommissioned at the Mare Island Naval Shipyard (formerly the Mare Island Navy Yard) on 21 June 1946, the Altair was transferred to the Maritime Commission on 8 July 1946 and her name struck from the Naval Vessel Register on 21 July 1946. Laid up in the National Defense Reserve Fleet's Suisun Bay, California, berthing area, the ship remained there until sold on 9 March 1948 to the Basalt Rock Company, which subsequently removed her from government custody and scrapped her.

References

Notes

Design 1079 ships
Ships built by Skinner & Eddy
1919 ships
Altair-class destroyer tenders
World War II auxiliary ships of the United States
Tenders of the United States Navy
Destroyer tenders of the United States